Ellen Bass (born June 16, 1947) is an American poet and author.  She has won three Pushcart Prizes and a Lambda Literary Award for her 2002 book Mules of Love. She co-authored the 1991 child sexual abuse book The Courage to Heal. She received a fellowship from the National Endowment for the Arts in 2014 and was elected a chancellor of the Academy of American Poets in 2017. Bass has taught poetry at Pacific University and founded poetry programs for prison inmates.

Life
Bass grew up in Pleasantville, New Jersey, where her parents owned a liquor store. Her family later moved to Ventnor City, New Jersey. She attended Goucher College, where she graduated magna cum laude in 1968 with a bachelor's degree. She pursued a master's degree in creative writing at Boston University, where she studied with Anne Sexton, and graduated in 1970. From 1970 to 1974, Bass worked at Project Place, a social service center in Boston.

From 1983 to 2003, she worked in the field of healing from childhood sexual abuse: writing the best-selling The Courage to Heal in 1991, developing training seminars for professionals, offering workshops for survivors, and lecturing to mental health professionals nationally and internationally. She is a co-founder of the Survivors Healing Center in Santa Cruz, a non-profit organization offering services to survivors of child sexual abuse.

Bass has taught poetry at the low-residency Master of Fine Arts program at Pacific University in Oregon since 2007. She has taught workshops in Santa Cruz, California since 1974 and also nationally. In 2013, she founded the Poetry Program at the Salinas Valley State Prison, which offers a weekly workshop to incarcerated men. In 2014, she also founded the Santa Cruz Poetry Project, which offers six weekly workshops to men and women incarcerated in the Santa Cruz County jails.

Among Bass' poetry books are Indigo, (2020) which was a finalist for the Paterson Poetry Prize, the Publishers Triangle Award and the Northern California Book Award; Like a Beggar (2014), which was a finalist for the Paterson Poetry Prize, the Publishing Triangle Award, the Milt Kessler Poetry Award, the Lambda Literary Award, and the Northern California Book Award; The Human Line (2007), and Mules of Love (2002), which won the Lambda Literary Award. Her poems have been published widely in journals and anthologies, including the New Yorker, the American Poetry Review, the Kenyon Review, and Ploughshares.

Her nonfiction books include I Never Told Anyone: Writings by Women Survivors of Child Sexual Abuse (HarperCollins, 1983), Free Your Mind: The Book for Gay, Lesbian and Bisexual Youth and Their Allies (HarperCollins, 1996), and The Courage to Heal: A Guide for Women Survivors of Child Sexual Abuse (HarperCollins, 1988, 2008), which has been translated into twelve languages.

In 2017, Bass was elected as a Chancellor of the Academy of American Poets.

Bass was named the Santa Cruz County Artist of the Year in 2019.

Bass lives in Santa Cruz, California with her wife, Janet Bryer. She has two children, Saraswati Bryer-Bass and Max Bryer-Bass.

Awards
Bass was awarded the Elliston Book Award for Poetry from the University of Cincinnati, Nimrod/Hardman's Pablo Neruda Prize, The Missouri Review’s Larry Levis Award, the Greensboro Poetry Prize, the New Letters Poetry Prize, the Chautauqua Poetry Prize, four Pushcart Prizes (2003, 2015, 2017), Fellowships from The Guggenheim Foundation, The National Endowment for the Arts, and the California Arts Council.

Indigo, (2020) was a finalist for the Paterson Poetry Prize, the Publishers Triangle Award and the Northern California Book Award. Like a Beggar (Copper Canyon Press, 2014) was a finalist for the Paterson Poetry Prize, the Publishing Triangle Award, the Milt Kessler Poetry Award, the Lambda Literary Award, and the Northern California Book Award. The Human Line (Copper Canyon Press, 2007) was named among the notable books of 2007 in the poetry section by the San Francisco Chronicle, and Mules of Love (BOA Editions, 2002) won the 2002 Lambda Literary Award.

Published works

Poetry 
 
 
Of Separateness and Merging. Autumn Press, 1977. .
For Earthly Survival. A letter press chapbook, Moving Parts Press, 1980.
Our Stunning Harvest. New Society Publishers, 1984. .
 
 
 
Indigo. Copper Canyon Press. 2020. .

Nonfiction

Children's books

References

External links
 

1947 births
Living people
Goucher College alumni
Boston University College of Arts and Sciences alumni
Poets from Pennsylvania
Poets from New Jersey
Poets from California
Writers from Santa Cruz, California
Writers from Philadelphia
Pacific University faculty
American women poets
Lambda Literary Award for Lesbian Poetry winners
National Endowment for the Arts Fellows
People from Pleasantville, New Jersey
People from Ventnor City, New Jersey
People from Santa Cruz, California
20th-century American poets
20th-century American women writers
21st-century American women writers
21st-century American poets
Writing teachers
American women academics